Marie H. Babka (1885 - 1978) was a former member of the Ohio House of Representatives from Cuyahoga County. She served the House from 1948 to 1950 and was a member of the Electoral College in 1948. She was the wife of John J. Babka.

References

Democratic Party members of the Ohio House of Representatives
Women state legislators in Ohio
1978 deaths
20th-century American politicians
20th-century American women politicians
1885 births
21st-century American women